The 1992 Illinois Fighting Illini football team was an American football team that represented the University of Illinois at Urbana-Champaign during the 1992 NCAA Division I-A football season. In their second year under head coach Lou Tepper, the Illini compiled a 6–5–1 record, finished in fourth place in the Big Ten Conference, and lost to Hawaii in the Holiday Bowl.

Quarterback Jason Verduzco led the team with 1,779 passing yards, while Darren Boyer led with 593 rushing yards. John Wright led with 508 receiving yards.

Several Illinois players received all-conference honors. Defensive lineman Simeon Rice was selected by the Associated Press (AP) as the Big Ten Freshman of the Year. Offensive tackle Brad Hopkins was selected by the AP as a first-team all-conference player, and linebacker Dana Howard and quarterback Verduzco were selected as a second-team player.

Schedule

Roster

References

Illinois
Illinois Fighting Illini football seasons
Illinois Fighting Illini football